The double reverse spin is a ballroom dance move used in the waltz and the quickstep.

Footwork

The double reverse spin consists of a heel pivot to Viennese cross (the left foot crossing in front of the right foot) for the follower and a reverse turn to toe pivot for the leader.

Leader (man)

Follower (lady)

References

External links
 

Waltz dance moves